Kyle Kazan (born March 11, 1967) is an American businessman who is the co-founder, chairman, and CEO of Glass House Group. He is also a founder and chairman of Beach Front Property Management, Inc. and co-founder and managing member of Beach Front Properties, LLC. Kazan has also served as a special education teacher at LAUSD and a police officer at the Torrance Police Department.

Early life and education

Kazan was born in 1967 in Inglewood, California to Richard and Anne Kazan. He was raised in the Palos Verdes peninsula and attended Palos Verdes High School from 1981 to 1985. Kazan then attended University of Southern California where he received his BA in history in 1990. While at USC, Kazan was recruited to play basketball from 1987 to 1990 as both a point guard and shooting guard by future Hall of Fame coach George Raveling.

Career

After graduating from USC in 1990, Kazan became a special education teacher at LAUSD in 1991. Four years later, Kazan served in the patrol division of the Torrance Police Department with collateral assignments and training in gang enforcement and drugs recognition and eradication until 1999. Throughout his tenure, he led his department in felony arrests twice in two consecutive 6-month periods, and testified as a court certified expert in drug sales.

Kazan began his real estate investment career with wife Diane Kazan in the late 1990s.  In 1997, Kazan and James B. Rosenwald co-founded Beach Front Properties, LLC., a real estate investment company based in southern California. Together their portfolio spans residential and commercial properties across the U.S., China and Germany with a focus on distressed properties, earning Kazan a reputation as a "vulture investor" and expert in turning rundown properties into stable assets. In 1999, Kazan left the police department and founded Beach Front Property Management, Inc., a third party property management company headquartered in Long Beach, CA.

In addition to real estate investing, Kazan has also been involved in the management of venture capital. With Steve Persky from Dalton Investments, Kazan has co-managed the Dalton Distressed Mortgage Fund since 1997. Kazan also has served as director of the Dalton High Yield Mortgage Fund since 2012 as well as Kings Bay Investment Company, Ltd since 2013.

Beginning in 2016, Kazan created four cannabis-focused private equity funds targeting different aspects of the industry, including the first fund, named “AP Investment Fund,” in which the “AP” stood for “Anti-Prohibition.” 

In 2020, Kazan rolled these funds into Glass House Group, Inc., a vertically integrated cannabis and hemp company in California. The new entity combined 500,000 square feet of greenhouse cannabis cultivation space, 9,600 acres of hemp cultivation land, 22,000 square feet of cannabis extraction and manufacturing space, in addition to several retail locations and brands across California, including its primary brand, Glass House Farms. On June 29, 2021, Glass House Group, Inc. completed its go-public transaction through a business combination with Mercer Park Brand Acquisition Corp. and officially changed its name to Glass House Brands Inc., and commenced trading on the NEO Exchange on July  5, 2021 (NEO: GLAS.A.U and GLAS.WT.U; OTCQX: GLASF and GHBWF). Kazan currently serves as the company's chairman and CEO.

Since December 2020, Glass House Brands has been working closely with the Weldon Project and MISSION [GREEN], a non-profit organization dedicated to ending federal prohibition of cannabis and achieving criminal justice reform for those convicted of nonviolent cannabis-related offenses, to advocate for policy change and clemency programs that address the lasting harm created by the War on Drugs. Glass House committed to spearheading fundraising initiatives for The Weldon Project as well as a campaign to petition the Biden administration to free all federal nonviolent cannabis prisoners. In December 2021, Kazan joins the Board of Directors of the Weldon Project and MISSION [GREEN].

Personal life

Since 2010, Kazan has appeared at several public speeches organized by Law Enforcement Against Prohibition (LEAP) as an outspoken advocate both in favor of the legalization of marijuana and against the war on drugs. He has also made several television appearances to oppose the war on drugs, including an interview conducted by CNN, and has advocated for the expungement of cannabis convictions and the release of cannabis prisoners, specifically Parker Coleman, Jr. 

Kazan also currently presides at the Redondo Beach chapter Cancer Support Community as president of the board of directors.

Company directorships / managing member

Affiliations

Cancer Support Community Redondo Beach (president on board of directors)) 
Wellness Community Redondo Beach (former board member) 
Apartment Association of Greater Los Angeles
Apartment Association of Southern California Cities (trade show co-chair)
Law Enforcement Against Prohibition (LEAP)

References

American hedge fund managers
University of Southern California alumni
American financial company founders
1967 births
American chief executives
Living people
American real estate businesspeople
People from Inglewood, California
People from Palos Verdes, California
People from Rolling Hills Estates, California